Blackwell is a suburb in the borough of Darlington and the ceremonial county of County Durham, England. It is situated towards the edge of the West End of Darlington, beside the River Tees. Blackwell consists of large 1930s style semi-detached and detached houses, and private, newly built homes. Blackwell Grange is an 18th-century country house converted into a hotel.

Its sports facilities include Blackwell Grange Golf Club, and Blackwell Meadows, home of Darlington RFC.

Notable People
 Philippa Langley MBE, Discovered the remains of Richard III in a car park in Leicester in 2012

References

External links

Villages in County Durham
Suburbs of Darlington
Places in the Tees Valley